Shugurovo (pronounced ) is a village (selo) in Leninogorsky District of the Republic of Tatarstan, Russia, located  south-west of Leninogorsk, the administrative center of the district, on the Lesnaya Sheshma River (a tributary of the Sheshma). Shugurovo was founded in the 19th century.  It was granted the status of urban-type settlement in 1950 but was demoted to a rural locality on October 25, 2004.

Population:   In 1989, ethnic Tatars constituted 86.9% and ethnic Russians–8.9% of the population. The majority of the village population are employed in the boehmite, bitumen, woodworking, and agricultural machinery industries.

There is a secondary school, a cultural center, a hospital, and a mosque in Shugurovo.

References

Rural localities in Tatarstan